Doctor Zhivago is the title of a novel by Boris Pasternak and its various adaptations.

Description
The story, in all of its forms, describes the life of the fictional Russian physician and poet Yuri Zhivago and deals with love and loss during the turmoil of the Russian Revolution and war.

Adaptations
Media using the name Doctor Zhivago includes the following:

Doctor Zhivago (novel), a 1957 novel by Boris Pasternak
Doctor Zhivago (film), a 1965 film adaptation by David Lean
Doctor Zhivago (TV series), a 2002 TV drama serial by Giacomo Campiotti, starring Hans Matheson
Doctor Zhivago (musical), a 2011 musical, composed by Lucy Simon

Former disambiguation pages converted to set index articles